

A–F 

To find entries for A–F, use the table of contents above.

G 

 G.A.Allen – Geraldine A. Allen (born 1950)
 G.A.Black – George Alexander Black (1916–1957)
 Gaertn. – Joseph Gaertner (1732–1791)
 G.A.Fryxell – Greta Albrecht Fryxell (1926–2017)
 Gage – Andrew Thomas Gage (1871–1945)
 Gagnebin –  (1707–1800)
 Gagnep. – François Gagnepain (1866–1952)
 Gaill. – Charles Gaillardot (1814–1883)
 Gaillard – Albert Gaillard (1858–1903)
 Gaimard – Joseph Paul Gaimard (1790–1858)
 G.A.Klebs – Georg Albrecht Klebs (1857–1918)
 Galasso – Gabriele Galasso (born 1967)
 Galbany – Mercè Galbany-Casals (fl. 2004), also as "Mercè Galbany"
 Gale – Shirley Gale Cross (1915–2008)
 Galeano – Gloria A. Galeano (1958–2016)
 Galeotti – Henri Guillaume Galeotti (1814–1858)
 Gallesio – Georgio Gallesio (1772–1839)
 Galpin – Ernest Edward Galpin (1858–1941)
 Galushko – Anatol I. Galushko (born 1926)
 Gamble – James Sykes Gamble (1847–1925)
 Gams – Helmut Gams (1893–1976)
 Gand. – Michel Gandoger (1850–1926)
 Gandhi – Kancheepuram Natarajan Gandhi (born 1948)
 G.A.Noble – Glenn Arthur Noble (1909–2001)
 G.A.Paterson – Grant A. Paterson (fl. 2011)
 Garay – Leslie Andrew Garay (born 1924)
 Garbari – Fabio Garbari (born 1937)
 García-Barr. – Hernando García-Barriga (1913–2005)
 Garcin – Laurent Garcin (1683–1752)
 Garcke – Christian August Friedrich Garcke (1819–1904)
 Garden – Alexander Garden (1730–1792)
 Gardiner – William Gardiner (1808–1852) 
 Gardner – George Gardner (1812–1849)
 Garn.-Jones – Philip John Garnock-Jones (born 1950)
 Garnet – John Roslyn Garnet (1906–1998)
 Garsault – François Alexandre Pierre de Garsault (1691–1778)
 Gasp. – Guglielmo Gasparrini (1803–1866)
 Gatt. – Augustin Gattinger (1825–1903)
 Gattef. – Jean Gattefossé (1899–1960) 
 Gatty – Margaret Scott Gatty (1809–1873)
 Gaudin – Jean François Aimée Gottlieb Philippe Gaudin (1766–1833)
 Gaudich. – Charles Gaudichaud-Beaupré (1789–1854)
 Gäum. – Ernst Albert Gäumann (1893–1963)
 Gaussen – Henri Marcel Gaussen (1891–1981)
 Gaut. – Marie Clément Gaston Gautier (1841–1911)
 G.A.Wallace – G. Ansley Wallace (fl. 1979)
 Gay – Claude Gay (1800–1873)
 Gáyer – Gyula Gáyer (1883–1932)
 G.Bertol. – Giuseppe Bertoloni (1804–1879)
 G.Bosc – Georges Bosc (1918–2000)
 G.B.Popov – George Basil Popov (fl. 1957)
 G.Brockman – Garry Brockman (born 1954)
 G.Chandler – Gregory T. Chandler (born 1972)
 G.Clifford – George Clifford III (1685–1760)
 G.C.Munro – George Campbell Munro (1866–1963) 
 G.C.S.Clarke – Giles C. S. Clarke (born 1944)
 G.C.Tucker – Gordon C. Tucker (born 1957)
 G.Cunn. – Gordon Herriott (Heriot) Cunningham (1892–1962)
 G.C.Wall. – George Charles Wallich (1815–1899)
 G.C.Whipple – George Chandler Whipple (1866–1924)
 G.Dahlgren – Gertrud Dahlgren (1931–2009)
 G.Dawson – Genoveva Dawson (1918–2012) 
 G.D.Duncan – Graham D. Duncan (fl. 1993)
 G.Don – George Don (1798–1856)
 G.D.Rowley – Gordon Douglas Rowley (1921–2019)
 G.D.Wallace – Gary D. Wallace (born 1946)
 G.E.Baker – Gladys Elizabeth Baker (1908–2007)
 Gebert – Wayne Ashley Gebert (born 1976)
 Geerinck – Daniel Geerinck (born 1945)
 Geh. – Adalbert Geheeb (1842–1909)
 G.E.Haglund – Gustaf Emmanuel Haglund (1900–1955)
 Geiger – Philipp Lorenz Geiger (1785–1836)
 Geissler – Ursula Geissler (1947–2000)
 G.E.Lee – Gaik Ee Lee (born 1981)
 Gelert – Otto Christian Leonor Gelert (1862–1899)
 Gelting – Paul Emil Elliot Gelting (1905–1964)
 Gemeinholzer – Birgit Gemeinholzer (fl. 2006)
 Genev. – Léon Gaston Genevier (1830–1880)
 Gennari – Patrizio Gennari (1820–1897)
 Gensel – Patricia G. Gensel (born 1944)
 Gentil – Ambroise Gentil (1842–1929)
 Gentry – Howard Scott Gentry (1903–1993)
 Georgi – Johann Gottlieb Georgi (1729–1802)
 Gereau – Roy Emile Gereau (born 1947)
 Gérard –  Louis Gérard (1733–1819)
 Gerrienne – Phillipe Gerrienne (fl. 2010)
 Gerstb. – Pedro Gerstberger (born 1951)
 Gerstner – Jacob Gerstner (1888–1948)
 G.E.Schatz – George Edward Schatz (born 1953)
 G.E.Sm. – Gerard Edwards Smith (1804–1881)
 Gesner – Conrad Gessner (1516–1565)
 Getachew – Getachew Aweke (born 1937)
 Geyer – Karl Andreas Geyer (1809–1853)
 Geyl. – Hermann Theodor Geyler (1834–1889)
 G.F.Atk. – George Francis Atkinson (1854–1918)
 G.F.Craig – Gillian F. Craig (fl. 2007)
 G.Fisch. – Georg Fischer (1844–1941)
 G.Fisch.Waldh. – Gotthelf Fischer von Waldheim (1771–1853)
 G.Forst. – Georg Forster (1754–1794)
 G.F.Walsh – Gerry F. Walsh (fl. 1993)
 G.Gaertn. – Gottfried Gaertner (1754–1825) (sometimes as Philipp Gottfried Gaertner)
 G.G.Niles – Grace Greylock Niles (fl. 1904)
 G.Haller – Gottlieb Emmanuel von Haller (1735–1786) (a son of Albrecht von Haller)
 G.Hend. – George Henderson (1836–1929)
 G.Hensl. – George Henslow (1835–1925)
 Ghesq. – Jean Hector Paul Auguste Ghesquière (1888–1982)
 Ghini – Luca Ghini (1490–1556)
 G.H.Martin – George Hamilton Martin (born 1887)
 G.H.M.Lawr. – George Hill Mathewson Lawrence (1910–1978)
 G.H.Morton – Gary H. Morton (fl. 1974)
 G.Holmes – Glenn Holmes (fl. 1999)
 G.H.S.Wood – Geoffrey H.S. Wood (1927–1957)
 G.H.Tate – George Henry Hamilton Tate (1894–1953)
 G.H.Wagner – Georg Heinrich Wagner (1859–1903)
 G.H.Zhu – Guang Hua Zhu (1964–2005)
 Gibbs – Lilian Gibbs (1870–1925)
 G.I.Baird – Gary Innes Baird (born 1955)
 Giesecke – Karl Ludwig (Sir Charles Lewis) Giesecke (1761–1833) (aka Johann Georg Metzler)
 Giess – Johan Wilhelm Heinrich Giess (1910–2000)
 Gilb. – Robert Lee Gilbertson (1925–2011)
 Gilg – Ernest Friedrich Gilg (1867–1933)
 Gilg-Ben. – Charlotte Gilg-Benedict (1872–1936)
 Gilib. – Jean-Emmanuel Gilibert (1741–1814)
 Gillek. – Léopold Guillaume Gillekens (1833–1905)
 Gillespie – John Wynn Gillespie (1901–1932)
 Gillham – C.M. Gillham (fl. 1980)
 Gilli – Alexander Gilli (1904–2007)
 Gillies – John Gillies (1792–1834)
 Gilliland – Hamish Boyd Gilliland (1911–1965)
 Gillis – William Thomas Gillis (1933–1979)
 Gilly – Charles Louis Gilly (1911–1970)
 Gilmour – John Scott Lennox Gilmour (1906–1986)
 Ging. – Frédéric Charles Jean Gingins de la Sarraz (1790–1863)
 Gir.-Chantr. – Justin Girod-Chantrans (1750–1841)
 Girg. – Gustav Karl Girgensohn (1786–1872)
 Gironella – Elizabeth P. Gironella
 Giseke – Paul Dietrich Giseke (1741–1796)
 Giul. – Ana Maria Giulietti (born 1945)
 Givnish – Thomas J. Givnish (born 1951)
 Gjaerev. – Olav Gjærevoll (1916–1994)
 G.J.Harden – Gwenneth J. Harden (born 1940)
 G.J.Jordan Gregory J. Jordan (fl. 2000)
 G.J.Leach – Gregory John Leach (born 1952)
 G.J.Lewis – Gwendoline Joyce Lewis (1909–1967)
 G.J.Sheph. – George John Shepherd (born 1949)
 G.Kadereit – Gudrun Kadereit (born 1969), see also her maiden name abbreviation Clausing
 G.Kirchn. – Georg Kirchner (1837–1885)
 G.Koch – Georg Friedrich Koch (1809–1874)
 G.Kunkel – Günther W.H. Kunkel (1928–2007)
 Glatf. – Noah Miller Glatfelter (1837–1911)
 G.Lawson – George Lawson (1827–1895)
 Glaz. – Auguste François Marie Glaziou (1828–1906)
 G.L.Chu – Ge Lin Chu (born 1934)
 G.L.Church – George Lyle Church (born 1903)
 G.L.Davis – Gwenda Louise Davis (1911–1993)
 Gleason – Henry Allan Gleason (1882–1975)
 Gledhill – David Gledhill (born 1929)
 Glehn – Peter von Glehn (1835–1876)
 G.Ll.Lucas – Grenville Llewellyn Lucas (born 1935)
 G.L.Nesom – Guy L. Nesom (born 1945)
 G.Lodd. – George Loddiges (1784–1846)
 G.López – Ginés Alejandro López González (born 1950)
 Glover – James Glover (1844–1925)
 Gloxin – Benjamin Peter Gloxin (1765–1794)
 G.L.Rob. – George Leslie Robinson (born 1959)
 G.L.Webster – Grady Linder Webster (1927–2005)
 G.Mans. – Guilhem Mansion (born 1968)
 G.Martens – Georg Matthias von Martens (1788–1872)
 G.Martin – George Martin (1827–1886)
 G.M.Barroso – Graziela Maciel Barroso (1912–2003)
 G.Mey. – Georg Friedrich Wilhelm Meyer (1782–1856)
 G.M.Levin – Gregory Moiseyevich Levin (fl. 1980)
 G.Moore – George Thomas Moore (1871–1956)
 G.M.Plunkett – Gregory M. Plunkett (born 1965)
 G.M.Sm. – Gilbert Morgan Smith (1885–1959)
 G.Murray – George Robert Milne Murray (1858–1911)
 G.M.Waterh. – Grace Marion Waterhouse (1906–1996)
 G.N.Backh. – Gary N. Backhouse (fl. 2007)
 G.N.Collins – Guy N. Collins (1872–1938)
 G.Nicholson – George Nicholson (1847–1908)
 G.N.Jones – George Neville Jones (1903–1970)
 G.Norman – George Norman (1824–1882)
 Goadby – Bede Theodoric Goadby (1863–1944)
 Gobi – Christoph Jakosolewitsch Gobi (1847–1925)
 Godfery – Masters John Godfery (1856-1945)
 God.-Leb. – Alexandre Godefroy-Lebeuf (1852–1903)
 Godm. – Frederick DuCane Godman (1834–1919)
 Godr. – Dominique Alexandre Godron (1807–1880)
 Goebel – Karl Christian Traugott Friedemann Goebel (1794–1851)
 Goeldi – Émil August Goeldi (variations: Göldi, Emílio Augusto Goeldi) (1859–1917)
 Goering – Philip Friedrich Wilhelm Goering (1809–1876)
 Goeschke – Franz Goeschke (1844–1912)
 Gokusing – Linus Gokusing (fl. 2014)
 Goldberg – Aaron Goldberg (1917–2014)
 Goldblatt – Peter Goldblatt (born 1943)
 Goldfuss – Georg August Goldfuss (1782–1848)
 Goldie – John Goldie (1793–1886)
 Goldman – Edward Alphonso Goldman (born as Goltman) (1873–1946)
 Goldring – William Goldring (1854–1919)
 Gomb. – René Gombault (born 1871)
 Gomes – Bernardino António Gomes (1769–1823)
 Gómez-Campo – César Gómez-Campo (1933–2009)
 Gómez Pompa – Arturo Gómez Pompa (born 1934)
 Gomont – Maurice Augustin Gomont (1839–1909)
 Gonez – Paul Gonez (fl. 2010)
 Goodd. – Leslie Newton Goodding (1880–1967)
 Gooden. – Samuel Goodenough (1743–1827)
 Goodsp. – Thomas Harper Goodspeed (1887–1966)
 Goodyer – John Goodyer (1592–1664)
 Gopalan – Rangasamy Gopalan (born 1947)
 Göpp. – Johann Heinrich Robert Göppert (1800–1884)
 Gordon – George Gordon (1806–1879)
 Gorozh. – Ivan Nikolaevich Gorozhankin (1848–1904)
 Gossw. – John Gossweiler (1873–1952)
 Gothan – Walther Ulrich Eduard Friedrich Gothan (1879–1954)
 Gottlieb – Leslie David Gottlieb (1936–2012)
 Gottsche – Carl Moritz Gottsche (1808–1892)
 Gottschl. – Günter Gottschlich (born 1951)
 Gouan – Antoine Gouan (1733–1821)
 Goudot – Justin Goudot (fl. 1822–1845)
 Gould – Frank Walton Gould (1913–1981)
 Gourret – Paul Gabriel Marie Gourret (1859–1903)
 Govaerts – Rafaël Herman Anna Govaerts (born 1968)
 Gowen – James Robert Gowen (1784–1862) 
 G.P.Baker – George Percival Baker (1856–1951)
 G.Pearson – Gilbert Pearson
 G.Perkins – George Henry Perkins (1844–1933)
 G.Petersen – Gitte Petersen (born 1963)
 G.P.Lewis – Gwilym Peter Lewis (born 1952)
 Gradst. – Stephan Robbert Gradstein (born 1943)
 Graebn. – Karl Otto Robert Peter Paul Graebner (1871–1933)
 Graells – Mariano de la Paz Graells y de la Agüera (1809–1898)
 Graf – Siegmund Graf (1801–1838)
 Graham – Robert Graham (1786–1845)
 Grande – Loreto Grande (1878–1965)
 Granv. – Jean-Jacques de Granville (1943–2022) 
 Gratel. – Jean Pierre A. Sylvestre de Grateloup (1782–1862)
 Grau –  (born 1937)
 Grauer – Sebastian Grauer (1758–1820)
 Gravely – Frederic Henry Gravely (1885–1965)
 Gray – Samuel Frederick Gray (1766–1828)
 Grecescu – Dimitrie Grecescu (1841–1910)
 Gredilla – Apolinar Federico Gredilla y Gauna (1859–1919)
 Greene – Edward Lee Greene (1843–1915)
 Greenm. – Jesse More Greenman (1867–1951)
 Greenway – Percy James Greenway (1897–1980)
 Greg. – Eliza Standerwick Gregory (1840–1932)
 Gren. – Jean Charles Marie Grenier (1808–1875)
 G.Retz. – Magnus Gustaf (Gustav) Retzius (1842–1919)
 Greuter – Werner Rodolfo Greuter (born 1938)
 Grev. – Robert Kaye Greville (1794–1866)
 Grey-Wilson – Christopher Grey-Wilson (born 1944)
 G.R.Hend. – Gemma Robyn Henderson (born 1976)
 Grierson – Andrew John Charles Grierson (1929–1990)
 Grieve – Brian John Grieve (1907–1997)
 Griff. – William Griffith (1810–1845)
 Griffioen – K. Griffioen
 Griffiths – David Griffiths (1867–1935)
 Griggs – Robert Fiske Griggs (1881–1962)
 Grimm – Johann Friedrich Carl Grimm (1737–1821)
 Grimwade – Russell Grimwade (1879–1955)
 Grindel – David Hieronymus Grindel (1776–1836)
 Grindon – Leopold Hartley Grindon (1818–1904)
 Gris – Jean Antoine Arthur Gris (1829–1872)
 Griscom – Ludlow Griscom (1890–1959)
 Griseb. – August Heinrich Rudolf Grisebach (1814–1879)
 Groeninckx – Inge Groeninckx (fl. 2010)
 Groenland – Johannes Groenland (1824–1891)
 Grognier – Louis Furcy Grognier (1776–1837)
 Grognot – Camille Grognot (1792–1869)
 Grolle – Riclef Grolle (1934–2004)
 Gronov. – Johan Frederik (Johannes Fredericus, Jan Fredrik) Gronovius (1686–1762)
 Groot. – Herman Johannes Grootendorst (born 1911)
 Groppo – Milton Groppo (fl. 2002)
 Grossh. – Alexander Alfonsovich Grossheim (1888–1948)
 G.Roth – Georg Roth (1842–1915)
 Grout – Abel Joel Grout (1867–1947)
 Grove – William Bywater Grove (1848–1938)
 Gr.Rossi – Graziano Rossi (born 1960)
 Grubov – Valery Ivanovitsch Grubov (1917–2009)
 Grudz. – Irina Aleksandrovna Grudzinskaya (born 1920)
 Gruith. – Franz von Paula (Franciscus de Paula) Gruithuisen (1774–1852)
 Grulich – Vít Grulich (1956–2022)
 Grumm-Grzhim. – Grigory Grumm-Grzhimaylo (Grum-Grshimailo) (1860–1936)
 Grüning – G.R. Grüning (1862–1926)
 Grushv. – Igor Vladimirovich Grushvitzky (1916–1991)
 G.Sancho – Gisela Sancho (fl. 1999)
 G.S.Bunting – George Sydney Bunting (1927–2015)
 G.Scheffler – Georg Scheffler (died 1910)
 G.Schellenb. – Gustav August Ludwig David Schellenberg (1882–1963)
 G.Schneid. – George Schneider (1848–1917)
 G.Schneid.bis – Georg Schneider (born 1888)
 G.Shaw – George Shaw (1751–1813)
 G.Simpson – George Simpson (1880–1952) 
 G.Sinclair – George Sinclair (1786–1834)
 G.Singh – Gurcharan Singh (born 1945)
 G.S.Mill. – Gerrit Smith Miller Jr. (1869–1956)
 G.S.Rawat – Gopal Singh Rawat (fl. 2010)
 G.S.Ringius – Gordon Stacey Ringius (born 1949)
 G.Stev. – Greta Stevenson (1911–1990)
 G.S.West – George Stephen West (1876–1919)
 G.Taylor – Sir George Taylor (1904–1993)
 G.T.Nesbit – Gladys T. Nisbet (born 1895)
 G.Tobler – Gertrud Tobler (1877–1948)
 G.S.Torr. – George Safford Torrey (1891–1977) 
 G.Trevir. – Gottfried Reinhold Treviranus (1776–1837) (older brother of Ludolph Christian Treviranus)
 G.T.S.Baylis – Geoffrey Thomas Sandford Baylis (1913–2003)
 G.T.Wright – Genevieve T. Wright (fl. 2018)
 Gueldenst. – Johann Anton Güldenstädt (1745–1781)
 Guett. – Jean Étienne Guettard (1715–1786)
 Guignard – Jean-Louis-Léon Guignard (1852–1928)
 Guilding – Lansdown Guilding (1797–1831)
 Guilf. – William Robert Guilfoyle (1840-1912)
 Guill. – Jean Baptiste Antoine Guillemin (1796–1842)
 Guillaumin – André Guillaumin (1885–1974)
 Guimpel – Friedrich Guimpel (1774–1839)
 Guinea – Emilio Guinea López (1907–1985)
 Gumbl. – William Edward Gumbleton (1840–1911)
 Gunckel – Hugo Gunckel Lűer (1901–1997)
 Güner – Adil Güner (born 1950)
 Gunn – Ronald Campbell Gunn (1808–1881)
 Gunnerus – Johann Ernst Gunnerus (1718–1773)
 Gün.Schneid. – Günther Schneider (born 1904)
 Gürke – Robert Louis August Maximilian Gürke (1854–1911)
 Guss. – Giovanni Gussone (1787–1866)
 Gus.Schneid. – Gustav Schneider (1834–1900)
 Gust.Fisch. – Gustav Fischer (born 1889)
 Guthrie – Francis Guthrie (1831–1899)
 Gutw. – Roman Gutwinski (1860–1932)
 Guymer – Gordon P. Guymer (born 1953)
 G.Vidal – Gustave Prosper Vidal (1835–1905)
 G.V.Pope – Gerald Vernon Pope (born 1941)
 G.Wall – George Wall (1820–1894)
 G.W.Andrews – George W. Andrews (born 1929)
 G.Watt – George Watt (1851–1930)
 G.W.Carr – Geoffrey William Carr (born 1948)
 G.W.Fisch. – George William Fischer (1906–1995)
 G.White – Gilbert White (1720–1793)
 G.W.Hu – Guang Wan Hu (fl. 2007)
 G.Wilh. – Gerould Wilhelm (born 1948)
 G.Winter – Heinrich Georg Winter (1848–1887)
 G.W.Martin – George Willard Martin (1886–1971)
 G.W.Rothwell – Gar W. Rothwell (born 1944)
 G.W.Schimp. – Georg Wilhelm Schimper (1804–1878)
 G.Zenker – Georg August Zenker (1855–1922)
 G.Zimm. – Gisbert Zimmermann (fl. 1978)

H–Z 

To find entries for H–Z, use the table of contents above.

 

1